The Osteopaths Act 1993 (c. 21) is an Act of the Parliament of the United Kingdom to regulate the practice of osteopathy. It received Royal Assent on 1 July 1993.

The Act created the General Osteopathic Council.

External links

United Kingdom Acts of Parliament 1993
Osteopathy in the United Kingdom
Medical regulation in the United Kingdom